Sinjaeviella elegantissima is a moth in the  family Cossidae. It is found in the Republic of Congo.

References

Natural History Museum Lepidoptera generic names catalog

Zeuzerinae